Los Perros del Mal (English: The Dogs of Evil) was a Mexican Lucha libre wrestling group stable, originally competed in Consejo Mundial de Lucha Libre and in Lucha Libre AAA World Wide (AAA). The name (meaning "The Dogs of Evil") is a play on the name of the founder of the group, Perro Aguayo Jr. It was one of the main rudo (heel) stables in CMLL until October 2008, when Aguayo along with Mr. Águila and Damián 666 left the company to form Perros del Mal Producciones. The stable is a part of the new promotion, despite its namesake. Their motto is "Dios perdona, los Perros no" ("God forgives, the Dogs don't."). The group originally started under the name La Furia del Norte but evolved into Los Perros del Mal as wrestlers not from northern Mexico joined the group.

History

La Furia del Norte
For the summer of 2004, the main storyline feud in Consejo Mundial de Lucha Libre (CMLL) was the heel trio of Pierroth Jr., Vampiro Canadiense and Tarzan Boy feuding with the técnico or face trio of Negro Casas, Shocker and Perro Aguayo Jr. The two factions finally faced off in a six-man cage match on July 18, 2004  where the last man in the cage got his head shaved. The rudos quickly escaped and Shocker tricked Casas and made his own escape, leaving Casas and Perro Aguayo Jr. Aguayo was victorious and Negro Casas, who had acted like a mentor for a time before this, had his head shaved leading to hostility.

The feud continued but soon Vampiro was injured in a match against the original Máscara Sagrada and was replaced by Héctor Garza, who had just jumped from Lucha Libre AAA World Wide (AAA), in a trios match at Arena México. Over the next few weeks, Perro turned on Casas and joined Garza. Soon Tarzan Boy from Los Guerreros del Infierno joined with Perro explaining that he and Garza could only trust other northerners. From that comment the name La Furia del Norte (Spanish for "The Northern Fury") was born as they all hailed from northern Mexico. Tarzan Boy and Héctor Garza hailed from Monterrey, Nuevo León and Perro Aguayo Jr. claims his father's Zacatecas as his home state, although he was born in Mexico City. A few weeks later one last Northerner joined the group, El Terrible, who had just turned on Shocker. The group's cowardly and suave antics made them an entertaining combination and they quickly rivaled Los Guerreros as the top heel group in CMLL.

After losing a match for the CMLL 71st Anniversary Show trophy to Negro Casas, Perro moved onto a short but heated feud with El Hijo del Santo with La Furia playing back-up. Shortly afterwards, Garza, Terrible and Tarzan began chasing the CMLL World Trios Championship, eventually defeating Black Warrior, Rayo de Jalisco Jr. and El Canek in November. Perrito joined forces with his former rivals Pierroth and Vampiro in their feud against Los Capos, ending at the year-end show when Pierroth and Vampiro lost their hair to Cien Caras and Máscara Año 2000 and Perro lost to Universo 2000 via disqualification in a singles match. The group's future was put in question when Garza was arrested in the United States with illegal steroids.

Los Perros del Mal
Perro still continued to feud with Los Capos and he used La Furia against them up until the big Perro Aguayo and Perro Aguayo Jr. versus Cien Caras and Máscara Año 2000 double hair match in March of that year. After Aguayo and his father were successful, Aguayo decided to start a new group consisting of La Furia del Norte, La Familia de Tijuana and other rudos called Los Perros del Mal. After the formation of Los Perros, the name "La Furia del Norte" referred only to the trio of Tarzan Boy, Terrible and Garza.

Latin Lover appeared as a member at Arena Mexico with Garza and Perro Jr. He wore the Perros del Mal shirt, and though it was only an appearance, was considered a member of the stable.

AAA Invasion
On June 6, 2010, at AAA's biggest event of the year, Triplemanía XVIII, Los Perros del Mal started an invasion storyline with the promotion. While many Perros del Mal Producciones workers have since made appearances in AAA, Perro Aguayo Jr., Damián 666, Halloween and L.A. Park are the four main members representing the stable in the company. Los Perros del Mal quickly aligned themselves with other rudo stables La Legión Extranjera, La Milicia and Los Maniacos to form La Sociedad, under the leadership of Dorian Roldan. On December 5, 2010, in the main event of Guerra de Titanes Dámian 666, Halloween and X-Fly achieved a major feat by ending Los Psycho Circus's three-year-long undefeated streak in a steel cage weapons match, albeit after an interference from Perro Aguayo Jr. The feud between Los Perros del Mal and Los Psycho Circus continued on May 29 at Perros del Mal Producciones third anniversary show, where Los Psycho Circus was victorious in a six man tag team steel cage Masks vs. Hairs match and, as a result, Super Crazy, the last man left in the cage, was forced to have his head shaved bald. On June 18 at Triplemanía XIX, Damián 666, Halloween and X-Fly defeated Los Psycho Circus in a tournament final to become the first ever AAA World Trios Champions. On July 31 at Verano de Escándalo, Los Perros del Mal faced Los Psycho Circus in a steel cage match, where the last person left in the cage would lose either his hair or mask. The match ended with Psycho Clown escaping the cage, leaving X-Fly inside and forcing him to have his hair shaved off. Los Perros del Mal and Los Psycho Circus ended their year long rivalry on October 9 at Héroes Inmortales, where Damián 666, Halloween and Nicho el Millonario were defeated in a Masks vs. Hairs steel cage match and were all shaved bald. On November 11, 2011, former member and reigning CMLL World Heavyweight Champion Héctor Garza jumped from CMLL to Perros del Mal Producciones to re-join the group. Shortly afterwards, El Texano Jr. also left CMLL and joined Los Perros del Mal, along with his brother Super Nova, though this partnership was short-lived as El Texano Jr. went on to form rival group, El Consejo. On March 11, 2012, Los Perros del Mal lost the AAA World Trios Championship to Los Psycho Circus. The following day, Damián 666, his son Bestia 666, Halloween and X-Fly announced that they had quit Los Perros del Mal. Halloween ended up returning to the group the following month, while the other vacant spots were filled by Taya Valkyrie, Teddy Hart, Trauma I and Trauma II. In mid-2013, El Hijo del Perro Aguayo began showing signs of a técnico turn by forming a new partnership with former rival Cibernético, which eventually led to Los Perros del Mal members Daga and Psicosis turning on their leader on November 22. Aguayo quickly announced that Daga and Psicosis' betrayal would not mark the end of Los Perros del Mal and that he would soon introduce a new incarnation of the stable. However, on December 8 at Guerra de Titanes, Aguayo, Daga and Psicosis revealed they had played Cibernético, when Aguayo turned on him and brought Los Perros del Mal back under the umbrella of the reformed La Sociedad. On February 21, 2014, longtime CMLL wrestler Black Warrior made a surprise return to AAA as the newest member of Los Perros del Mal. Daga left Los Perros del Mal on April 19 to lead the Anarquía stable.

On March 21, 2015, Aguayo died following a freak accident during a wrestling match, throwing the stable's future into question. While Pentagón Jr. and Taya continued representing Los Perros del Mal in AAA events following Aguayo's death, Joe Líder stated that the group's future was still uncertain. In January 2017, Daga, Garza Jr. and Pentagón Jr. all quit AAA and made an appearance for The Crash promotion, wearing Los Perros del Mal gear. The current status of the group is uncertain. Daga and Pentagón Jr. had hopes they would be able to continue using the name Los Perros del Mal on the independent circuit with Garza Jr. as a new member, but on January 24 they instead announced they were leaving the group.

 Members 

Former Members
El Hijo del Perro Aguayo (leader)
Joe Líder
Halloween
Mr. Águila
Averno
Bestia 666
Black Warrior
Blue Demon Jr.
Cibernético
Damián 666
Daga
Eita
Ek Balam
Héctor Garza
Ivelisse Vélez
L.A. Park
Latin Lover
Mephisto
Pentagón Jr.
Pequeño Damián 666
Pequeño Halloween
Pete Powers
Pierroth Jr.
Psicosis
Ricky Marvin
Shocker
Super Nova
Tarzan Boy
Taya
Teddy Hart
El Terrible
El Texano Jr.
X-Fly

Championships and accomplishmentsConsejo Mundial de Lucha LibreCMLL World Trios Championship (2 times) – Héctor Garza, El Terrible and Tarzan Boy (1), Perro Aguayo Jr., Mr. Águila, Héctor Garza (1)
Mexican National Trios Championship (1 time) – Damián 666, Halloween and Mr. Águila
Occidente Tag Team Championship (1 time) – El Texano Jr. and El TerribleIndependent/International Wrestling LeagueIWL Tag Team Championship (1 time) – Bestia 666 and X-FlyInternational Wrestling Revolution GroupIWRG Intercontinental Trios Championship (1 time) – Bestia 666, Damián 666 and X-FlyLucha Libre AAA WorldwideAAA Cruiserweight Championship (1 time) – Daga
AAA Reina de Reinas Championship (1 time) – Taya
AAA World Tag Team Championship (1 time) – Líder and Pentagón Jr.
AAA World Trios Championship (1 time) – Damián 666, Halloween and X-Fly
Copa Triplemanía XXII (2014) – El Hijo del Perro Aguayo
Rey de Reyes (2012) – El Hijo del Perro Aguayo
Rey de Reyes (2016) – Pentagón Jr.Perros del Mal ProduccionesPerros del Mal Extremo Championship (1 time) – X-Fly
Mexican National Heavyweight Championship (2 times) – X-Fly (1) and Héctor Garza (1)
Copa Perros del Mal Extremo (2011) – HalloweenProducciones Sánchez'
Trofeo Arena Neza (2016) - Joe Líder, Kahn del Mal & Pentagon Jr.

Luchas de Apuestas record

Notes

References

Lucha Libre AAA Worldwide teams and stables
Consejo Mundial de Lucha Libre teams and stables